The Pulicinae form a flea subfamily (or in other classifications a tribe called Pulicini) in the family Pulicidae.

References

External links

Insect subfamilies
Pulicidae